Huddersfield Town's 1962–63 campaign was an impressive season for the Town. They finished 6th in Division 2, just 4 points off Chelsea, who took the second promotion spot to Division 1. They finished their campaign on the same points as Leeds United.

Squad at the start of the season

Review
After the success of the previous season, Town under Eddie Boot were hoping to mount yet another promotion push to Division 1. An impressive start to the season saw Town unbeaten in their first 13 league games of the season. This run was ended by a home defeat from Southampton on 27 October. A mixed November and December saw Town lose ground, but an amazingly cold snap during the winter would see the team out of action for 3 months at Leeds Road. During that time, Town played only 3 away league games and an FA Cup game at Manchester United. Town would have to play their last 20 games in 2 and a half months.

It was a tall order and Town's impressive start to the season slowly evaporated. Too many draws and losses during the period saw Town lose ground with the leading pack of Stoke City, Chelsea and Sunderland. A win over Leeds United in May, gave Town a faint hope of promotion, but 2 defeats to Portsmouth and Cardiff City saw Town finish down in 6th place with 48 points.

Squad at the end of the season

Results

Division Two

FA Cup

Football League Cup

Appearances and goals

Huddersfield Town A.F.C. seasons
Huddersfield Town F.C.